Ras-related protein Rab-25 is a protein that in humans is encoded by the RAB25 gene.
It is thought to act as a promoter of tumor development.

Interactions
RAB25 has been shown to interact with RAB11FIP2 and RAB11FIP5.

References

Further reading